Tărlungeni is a commune in Brașov County, Transylvania, Romania. It is composed of four villages: Cărpiniș (Kerpenest), Purcăreni (Pürkerec), Tărlungeni and Zizin (Zajzon).

The commune is located in the southeastern part of the county, just east of the county seat, Brașov, and belongs to the Brașov metropolitan area. Tărlungeni lies on the banks of the river Tărlung and its affluent, the Zizin.

The first attestation of the locality dates back to November 4, 1484, when the voivode of Transylvania, Stephen V Báthory, came to Brașov to mediate a dispute between the villages of Prejmer and Tărlungeni over the usage of the waters of the river Tărlung.

At the 2011 census, 39.9% of inhabitants were Romanians, 30.7% Roma and 29.1% Hungarians. At the 2002 census, 61.3% were Romanian Orthodox, 31.2% Evangelical Lutheran, 3.6% Pentecostal and 1.1% Roman Catholic.

Zizin is known for its mineral water springs, originating from the phreatic zone of the Ciucaș Mountains; the first official description of the springs dates from 1773.

From 1983 to 2016 the Liga II football club CS Unirea Tărlungeni was based in the commune.

Natives
 György Barkó (born 1931), Romanian and Hungarian actor
 Ștefan Foriș (1892–1946), Romanian communist activist

See also

References

Communes in Brașov County
Localities in Transylvania
Mocani